Boris Trávníček (born 19 May 1998) is a Czech-born Slovak para table tennis player who competes in international table tennis competitions. He is a Paralympic bronze medalist and a double World bronze medalist.

In 2011, a headstone fell onto Trávníček during a class excursion at a Jewish cemetery in Rousinov. He had an open fracture in his right leg, a broken left arm and injured his vertebrae which resulted in paraplegia.

References

1998 births
Living people
Sportspeople from Bratislava
Paralympic table tennis players of Slovakia
Slovak male table tennis players
Table tennis players at the 2020 Summer Paralympics
Medalists at the 2020 Summer Paralympics
People from Vyškov
Sportspeople from the South Moravian Region